Imbuljuta tal-Qastan is a traditional Maltese drink served after Midnight Mass and on New Year's Eve. It is made using cocoa, chestnuts, cloves and citrus zest.

References 

Maltese cuisine
Chocolate drinks
Chestnut dishes